Dmitry Anatolyevich Krasilnikov (born 7 May 1979) is a former Russian professional association football player.

Club career
He played in the Russian Football National League for FC Nizhny Novgorod in 2009.

Honours
 Russian Second Division, Zone Centre best goalkeeper: 2010.

References

External links
 

1979 births
Sportspeople from Nizhny Novgorod
Living people
Russian footballers
Association football goalkeepers
FC Dynamo Kirov players
FC Nizhny Novgorod (2007) players
FC Torpedo NN Nizhny Novgorod players
FC Lokomotiv Kaluga players
FC Volga Ulyanovsk players